The 1997 Finnish Cup was the 43rd season of the main annual association football cup competition in Finland. It was organised as a single-elimination knock–out tournament and participation in the competition was voluntary.  The final was held at the Olympic Stadium, Helsinki on 25 October 1997 with FC Haka defeating TPS by 2-1 (aet) before an attendance of 4,107 spectators.

Early rounds 
Not currently available.

Round 7

Quarter-finals

Semi-finals

Final

References

External links
 Suomen Cup Official site 

Finnish Cup seasons
Finnish Cup, 1997
Finnish Cup, 1997